Mark Thomson (1739 – December 14, 1803) was a United States representative from New Jersey. Born in Norriton Township (near Norristown, Pennsylvania), he engaged in milling, was justice of the peace of Sussex County, New Jersey in 1773, and was a member of the provincial convention in 1774 and of the Provincial Congress in 1775. He was commissioned lieutenant colonel of the First Regiment, Sussex County Militia on July 22, 1775, and was lieutenant colonel in Col. Charles Stewart's Battalion of Minutemen, February 15, 1776; colonel of the First Regiment, Sussex County Militia, July 10, 1776; and colonel of the Battalion of Detached New Jersey Militia, July 18, 1776.

Thomson was a member of the New Jersey General Assembly in 1779 and served in the New Jersey Legislative Council (now the New Jersey Senate) from 1786 to 1788. He was appointed lieutenant colonel and aide-de-camp on the staff of Gov. Richard Howell on June 10, 1793, and was elected as a Federalist to the Fourth and Fifth Congresses, serving from March 4, 1795, to March 3, 1799. He died in Marksboro; interment was in the Hughesville Cemetery, Warren County, New Jersey.

References

1739 births
1803 deaths
New Jersey militiamen in the American Revolution
Members of the New Jersey General Assembly
Members of the New Jersey Legislative Council
Politicians from Sussex County, New Jersey
People of colonial New Jersey
Burials in New Jersey
Federalist Party members of the United States House of Representatives from New Jersey